Fritz Sdunek (18 April 1947 – 22 December 2014) was a German professional boxing trainer and previously an amateur boxer. Regarded as one of the most successful and famous boxing trainers, he trained, among others, such world champions as Wladimir and Vitali Klitschko and Dariusz Michalczewski. He was born in Lüssow, East Germany.

Sport career
Fritz Sdunek's career started in amateur boxing. Its highlight was a victory at a Students Championship of East Germany in 1968. He won 99 of his 129 amateur fights, then decided to become a trainer.

In 1979 he graduated from the Deutsche Hochschule für Körperkultur (a university) with a diploma as a sport teacher.

Since the 1960s Sdunek was a member of a sport club  Traktor Schwerin, where he also worked as a trainer until 1989. There he trained among others Andreas Zülow, who won a gold medal (lightweight) at 1988 Summer Olympics in Seoul.

From 1994 until his death in 2014 Sdunek was active as a trainer for a famous Hamburg boxing promotion organization Universum Box-Promotion.

Private life
Fritz Sdunek was born in 1947 in post-World War II Germany, on a territory which soon became East Germany. His birthplace is the village of Lüssow near the Baltic sea, today part of Mecklenburg-Vorpommern.

Sdunek was married and had two children - a son and a daughter. His daughter was married to Ahmet Öner, a German of Turkish descent, head of Hamburg professional promotional firm Arena Box-Promotion and ex-professional boxer.

Death
He died in a hospital in Hamburg on 22 December 2014, at the age of 67 following a heart attack he had suffered earlier on the island of Gran Canaria.

Boxers trained by Fritz Sdunek
Fritz Sdunek trained many boxers, both professional and amateur.

Previously trained:
  Vitali Klitschko
  Zsolt Erdei
  Felix Sturm
  Ola Afolabi
  Wladimir Klitschko
  Dariusz Michalczewski
  Juan Carlos Gómez
  Artur Grigorian
  Ralf Rocchigiani
  Thomas Ulrich
  István Kovács
  Mihai Leu
  Károly Balzsay
  Sebastian Zbik
  Mario Veit
  Alexander Dimitrenko
  Denis Boytsov
  Khoren Gevor
  Sinan Şamil Sam
  Akhmed Kotiev
  Grigory Drozd
  Aleksandr Alekseyev
  Andreas Zülow
  Nenad Borovčanin

References

Sources
 Information about Fritz Sdunek on the web site of Universum Box-Promotion — source for the most of the facts featured in this article

1947 births
2014 deaths
People from Vorpommern-Greifswald
German male boxers
East German male boxers
Boxing trainers
Sportspeople from Mecklenburg-Western Pomerania
Recipients of the Banner of Labor